The 2005 Rally Argentina was the ninth round of the 2005 World Rally Championship season. It took place between July 14–17, 2005. Citroën's Sébastien Loeb won the race, his 17th win in the World Rally Championship.

Results

References

External links

 Results at ewrc-results.com

Argentina
Rally Argentina
Rally